York High School may refer to:
York High School, York, North Yorkshire, England
York High School (George), George, South Africa
York High School (Maine),  Maine, United States
York Middle/High School, Retsof, New York, United States
York High School (Virginia), Yorktown, Virginia, United States
York Community High School, Elmhurst, Illinois, United States
York Comprehensive High School, York, South Carolina, United States
York Catholic High School, York, Pennsylvania, United States